Yuval Avidor (born 19 October 1986) is an Israeli football player who plays for F.C. Haifa Robi Shapira. He is known for his speed and ability to play as a striker as well as a winger.

Early life
Avidor was born in Kiryat Motzkin, Israel, to a Jewish family.

Career

Hapoel Haifa
Avidor made his debut for Hapoel Haifa in 2004–2005 season in the Israeli second division Liga Leumit. He played for Haifa for two more seasons and on 2006–2007 season he finished as the Liga Leumit top goalscorer with 17 goals but missed promotion with the club finishing 3rd.

Hapoel Ironi Kiryat Shmona
Before the 2007–2008 season he moved to Northern club Ironi Kiryat Shmona which just won promotion to the Israeli Premier League reuniting with his former coach Ran Ben Shimon . Helping the team finish 3rd scoring 9 goals. The next season was last with the club due to his relegation and Avidor scoring only 6 goals.

Maccabi Tel Aviv
Although his team was relegated Avidor himself became one of the biggest transfer prospects of the summer. Which concluded with signing a one-year contract with giants Maccabi Tel Aviv. His first season with the club was a tough one with him scoring only 5 goals and the team finishing 3rd far behind their fierce rivals Hapoel Tel Aviv and Maccabi Haifa. In May 2010 it was announced that Maccabi and Avidor agreed on the extension of his contract.

Hapoel Haifa
On 20 September 2011 he was loaned to Hapoel Haifa from Hapoel Ironi Kiryat Shmona until the end of the 2011–12 season. On 10 December he scored twice in Hapoel's first derby win in ten years.

References

External links
 Avidor Profile
 

1986 births
Living people
Israeli Jews
Israeli footballers
Maccabi Tel Aviv F.C. players
Hapoel Ironi Kiryat Shmona F.C. players
Hapoel Haifa F.C. players
Hapoel Acre F.C. players
Maccabi Netanya F.C. players
Bnei Sakhnin F.C. players
Maccabi Petah Tikva F.C. players
Hapoel Ramat Gan F.C. players
Hapoel Nof HaGalil F.C. players
F.C. Kafr Qasim players
Hapoel Marmorek F.C. players
F.C. Haifa Robi Shapira players
Israeli Premier League players
Liga Leumit players
Israel under-21 international footballers
Footballers from Kiryat Motzkin
Israeli people of Romanian-Jewish descent
Association football forwards